Beryu may refer to:
 Beryu, Iran
 Beryu, Kyrgyzstan